{{Infobox person
|name                 = Maity Interiano
|image                = Maity Interiano.JPG
|caption              =
|birth_place          = Gainesville, Florida, United States
|death_date           =
|death_place          =
|death_cause          =
|other_names          =
|education            = Elon University, North Carolina
|occupation           = News anchor, "Noticiero Univision: Edición Nocturna"
|years_active         = 2006-present
|employer             = Univision
|known_for            = Despierta America|spouse               = Anuar Zidan (2022-present)
|awards               = Emmy 
|website              = http://www.maityonthego.com
}}

Maity Interiano (born Maria Teresa Interiano Medina) is an Emmy Award Winning journalist, and anchor for Univision Noticiero_Univision.

General information
 
In the summer of 2005 she did an internship in the Spanish investigative show Aquí y Ahora'' in Univision Network and in the entertainment show Escandalo TV in Telefutura Network (now Unimas).

Career
After graduating in 2006 from Elon University in North Carolina she started to work as an associate producer and reporter in Escandalo TV, and was producing a weekly segment called "Vamos al Cine" until October 2011. Interiano has covered  Premios Juventud, Premio lo Nuestro, Latin Grammy, Nuestra Belleza Latina since 2007. In April 2011 she covered the Royal Wedding of Principe William and Catherine, Duchess of Cambridge in London for Escandalo TV y La Tijera in Telefutura Network (now Unimas). In 2012 she covered the Golden Globe for Tómbola, y the Oscars for Despierta América. In 2011 she participated in Teletón México in Telefutura Network and in 2012 in Teleton United States where she was accompanying the Teleton troop where actor Carlos Ponce was participating. From October 2011 to January 2012 she was in the show Tómbola on Telefutura network (now Unimas) as a reporter.

Maity is currently in the morning show Despierta America in Univision with entertainment coverage, with the "Vamonos al Cine" segment and interviewing international artists like Vin Diesel, Tony Bennett, Johnny Depp, Angelina Jolie, George Clooney, Salma Hayek, Sofia Vergara, Ricky Martin, Shakira, Alejandro Fernández, Antonio Banderas, Cameron Diaz and many more. In June 2013 she went to Brazil to do the entertainment notes that came out in Univision Deportes during the 15 days of the world Confederations Cup.
On January 17, 2022 Maity was appointed as co anchor of Noticiero Univisión Fin de Semanas with Felix De Bedout 

After breaking a relationship with somebody out of the public eye from Dominican Republic that she began dating from 2020, Maity is currently dating Anuar Zidan, a news producer from Univision Noticias and owner of Zidan Wines.

Awards 
On July 24 she won a Regional LA Area Emmy Award for hosting the Desfile de Las Rosas 2015 on Univision.

References

External links 
Official website 

Facebook Fanpage
Maity on Instagram

Honduran television journalists
American television journalists
American women television journalists
Living people
1985 births
21st-century American women